Justice League: Doom is a 2012 American animated superhero film, loosely based on "JLA: Tower of Babel", a 2000 comic book storyline by writer Mark Waid that ran in the DC Comics series JLA. The film's script was adapted by writer Dwayne McDuffie, and it is directed by Lauren Montgomery.

A standalone sequel to Crisis on Two Earths, the film uses the same character designs by the lead character designer, Phil Bourassa, as well as footage from the film in the opening. It was released on February 28, 2012. The film also features various actors reprising their roles from the DC Animated Universe. It is the 13th film of the DC Universe Animated Original Movies.

Plot

The Justice League and Cyborg stop the Royal Flush Gang's attempted robbery of a diamond vault using complex technology that allows them to pass through solid objects. Meanwhile, Vandal Savage plots to start a new civilization by exterminating two thirds of the population, and it is revealed that he gave the technology to the Gang for testing. Savage hires Mirror Master to hack into the Batcomputer and steal contingency plans devised by Batman to incapacitate his League teammates lest they go rogue. Savage assembles Cheetah, Star Sapphire, Metallo, Bane, Mirror Master, and Ma'alefa'ak and offers each of them a large sum of money to simultaneously attack the League members using the plans, which he has altered to be lethal. When the supervillains agree, he welcomes them to the Legion of Doom.

As the Legion of Doom each do their part to take out the Justice League, Batman is informed by Alfred Pennyworth that the bodies of Thomas and Martha Wayne have been exhumed and are missing. At their graves, Bruce is ambushed by Bane, who beats him to near death before rendering him unconscious and burying him alive in his father's coffin.

Martian Manhunter celebrates his birthday with his colleagues in his civilian identity as John Jones. He receives a drink from a disguised Ma'afela'ak in the form of a beautiful woman, which is laced with a poison that contains magnesium carbonate. As magnesium is disruptive to Martian biology, the Manhunter struggles to maintain form while expelling the poison. Ma'alefa'ak then sets him on fire, with the magnesium continually fuelling the flames.

Cheetah ambushes Wonder Woman at a dock and scratches her in the process, infecting her body with nanomachines that  affect her brainstem; the nanomachines cause her to perceive everyone around her as Cheetah. Since the villainess knows that Wonder Woman will never quit a fight, the Amazon will continue to do so until she dies from a stress-induced heart attack or brain aneurysm. The delirious Amazon proceeds to attack both Cheetah and nearby innocent bystanders.

Mirror Master lures Flash into a trap, attaching a bomb to the speedster's wrist. If Flash does nothing, tries to remove it or decreases in speed, the bomb will explode, killing everyone in a three-mile radius.

Lured to a mine, Green Lantern is targeted by Star Sapphire using Scarecrow's will-undermining fear gas.  After he fails to save her hostages' lives, she exploits his fears to convince him that he does not deserve his mantle; the grief-stricken Jordan renounces his ring and resigns himself to his fate in the collapsing mine.

On the Daily Planets roof, a former employee named Henry Ackerman is aiming to commit suicide which has attracted the attention of the media, including Lois Lane and Jimmy Olsen. After leaving a press conference as Clark Kent, Superman arrives on the scene and apparently succeeds in talking Ackerman down. However, Ackerman reveals himself as a disguised Metallo and shoots Superman with a Kryptonite bullet, critically injuring him and causing him to fall to street level from the roof.

Back at the Hall of Doom, the Legion celebrates their victory. Savage reveals that his next plan is to fire a rocket into the sun, triggering a solar flare that will destroy half of the planet and disable any technology more advanced than a steam engine. He relates his past and invites a skeptical Cheetah to test his claim of being immortal, which she does by cutting his throat; the assembled villains are all stunned when Savage gets up and the wounds heal before their eyes without leaving even a scratch. With his claim proven, he shows his teammates the rocket that will be used in his plan.

Batman comes close to accepting his fate, but a tape recorder left behind by Bane plays a taunting message from the criminal, which motivates him to break out with the memory of his father's death. Batman realizes the League has been attacked using his contingency plans and sets out to save his allies. At the same time, Cyborg hears of Wonder Woman's predicament and sets out on his own.

Cyborg arrives on the scene of Wonder Woman's rampage, and blasts her with a sonic frequency that neutralizes the nanites. After coordinating with Batman, the two move to save Martian Manhunter, with Wonder Woman injecting him with aluminum oxide to neutralize the magnesium at Batman's instruction. Meanwhile, Batman tells Flash to run and vibrate through an iceberg in the Arctic, leaving the bomb inside and saving him. After saving Flash, Batman arrives at the collapsed mine and forces his way in, finding the broken Jordan. Batman shows him that the hostages and terrorists were merely androids. Sure of himself once more, Jordan re-establishes his will and regains control of his ring.

Wonder Woman, Cyborg and Martian Manhunter arrive in Metropolis, where Superman's health has rapidly deteriorated; paramedics have failed to remove the bullet due to his invulnerability. It is extracted by Cyborg and the Manhunter using an improvised Kryptonite scalpel laser, allowing Superman to recover.

The League retreats to the Watchtower, where Batman reveals he was the real mastermind behind the plans, and that they were originally only supposed to subdue. He also had a plan in place should the Batcomputer be hacked: a hidden tracing algorithm. The League track down the Legion of Doom and subdue them, but fail to prevent the rocket from launching and triggering the solar flare. Using the Hall of Doom's technology, the League saves the Earth by phasing it so the flare harmlessly passes through.

At the Justice League Watchtower, Superman reports that Vandal Savage has been found guilty of crimes against humanity and sentenced to life without parole by the World Court. The Justice League officially adds Cyborg to their roster, and Superman calls for a vote on whether Batman should be allowed to remain a League member. Batman defends his action and criticizes the others for not understanding the potential danger of a rogue Justice League before quitting the team outright. When Superman asks if Batman had a plan to stop himself if he were to go rogue, Batman states that the Justice League itself is his plan. With his trust in Batman assured, Superman hands him the Kryptonite bullet and teleports him out of the Watchtower.

Voice cast

 Kevin Conroy as Bruce Wayne / Batman: a playboy billionaire who secretly operates as a masked vigilante after the murder of his parents. He secretly has contingency plans to subdue the members of the Justice League if they use their power for evil.
 Tim Daly as Kal-El / Clark Kent / Superman: an extraterrestrial from the planet Krypton who can fly, has super strength and can shoot laser beams from his eyes. In public, he works as a reporter for the Daily Planet
 Susan Eisenberg as Princess Diana / Wonder Woman: a demigoddess princess and Amazon warrior from Themyscira
 Nathan Fillion as Hal Jordan / Green Lantern: a test pilot who uses a ring fueled by willpower to fly and creates hard light constructs
 Carl Lumbly as J'onn J'onzz / Martian Manhunter: a shape-shifter from Mars
Ma'alefa'ak J'onnz / Ma'alefa'ak (uncredited): another Martian who serves as J'onzz's nemesis
 Michael Rosenbaum as Barry Allen / The Flash: a CSI who was given super speed after getting struck by lightning and doused with chemicals
 Bumper Robinson as Victor Stone / Cyborg: a former athlete who was enhanced with cybernetic enhancements following a near-fatal accident
 Carlos Alazraqui as Bane: one of Batman's adversaries, who enhances his strength with venom tubes attached to his back
 Dee Bradley Baker as Officer in Charge
 Claudia Black as Barbara Ann Minerva / Cheetah: Wonder Woman's nemesis, who was cursed to take the form of a cheetah and blames Wonder Woman for her situation
 Paul Blackthorne as John Corben / Metallo: an android, and one of Superman's adversaries, who has a heart of pure Kryptonite
Henry Ackerson (uncredited): a former reporter for the Daily Planet, who Metallo uses as a disguise.
 Olivia d'Abo as Carol Ferris / Star Sapphire: one of Green Lantern's adversaries, with similar abilities
 Grey DeLisle as Lois Lane: a reporter for the Daily Planet
Queen (uncredited): a member of the Royal Flush Gang
 Alexis Denisof as Sam Scudder / Mirror Master: one of Flash's adversaries, who uses holograms, a mirror gun and can hide through reflective surfaces
 Robin Atkin Downes as Alfred Pennyworth: Bruce's butler
Jack (uncredited): a member of the Royal Flush Gang
 Brian George as Mayor of Metropolis
 Danny Jacobs as Special Agent Porter
 David Kaufman as Jimmy Olsen: a photographer for the Daily Planet
 Juliet Landau as Ten: a member of the Royal Flush Gang
 Jim Meskimen as King: a member of the Royal Flush Gang
 Phil Morris as Vandar Adg / Vandal Savage: an immortal tyrant who seeks to take over the Earth
 Andrea Romano as Batcomputer voice
 Bruce Timm as Ace: an android who works for the Royal Flush Gang

 The actor/actress's voice role is reprised from the DC animated universe.
 The actress who supplied the voice for Ma'alefa'ak's female disguise is uncredited and unknown.

Production
The film was first announced at WonderCon 2011 that the JLA: Tower of Babel storyline will be adapted as a direct-to-video movie, which was written by Dwayne McDuffie right before his death. The character designs were done by Phil Bourassa, the lead character designer of Justice League: Crisis on Two Earths and Young Justice. Storyboards were overseen and animated by Telecom Animation Film. During the casting process of Justice League: Doom, voice director Andrea Romano expressed an interest for the cast from various media to reprise their roles as members of the Justice League.

Reception
IGN gave the film a 7 out of 10, calling it "An immensely enjoyable thrill ride, but also an occasionally frustrating and short adaptation."

It earned $7,500,888 from domestic home video sales.

Home media
The Blu-ray combo pack includes Featurettes only for Blu-ray called “Guarding the Balance: Batman and the JLA”, a mini-Featurette called “Their Time Has Come: Cyborg and the DC Universe’s New Diversity”, while both Blu-ray and the 2-Disc DVD edition has  "A Legion of One: The Dwayne McDuffie Story", a Sneak Peek at Superman vs. The Elite, and two bonus episodes of Justice League: "Wild Cards" part 1 and 2.

See also
 Tartarus (DC Comics)

References

External links

 
 Justice League: Doom @ The World's Finest

2010s American animated films
2010s direct-to-video animated superhero films
2012 animated films
2012 direct-to-video films
2012 films
2010s animated superhero films
Animated Justice League films
DC Universe Animated Original Movies
2010s English-language films
Films directed by Lauren Montgomery
Animated superhero films
Animated science fiction films
2010s science fiction films